Hugh McQueen Street (January 7, 1833 - May 31, 1920) was an American businessman and Democratic politician. He served in the Mississippi House of Representatives from 1870 to 1880, 1890 to 1894, and from 1908 to 1912. He was its Speaker in four different stints (1873–1874, 1876–1878, 1892–1894, 1908–1912).

Early life and family 
Hugh McQueen Street was born on January 7, 1833, in Moore County, North Carolina. He was of Scottish ancestry. He was the oldest of 13 children of Donald Street, whose family first settled in Prince William County, Virginia, before moving to North Carolina; and his wife, Lydia (McBryde) Street. Street's paternal great-uncle, Hugh McQueen, was an Attorney General of North Carolina. Street's maternal grandfather, Archibald McBryde, was a member of Congress.

Street attended an "old-field school" in 1840, and attended Carthage High School from 1847 to 1848. Street moved with his family to Tishomingo County, Mississippi, in 1852.

Military career 
In 1861, Street joined the Confederate Army, and served, mostly on detached duty, until 1865. He was a member of the 26th Mississippi Infantry Regiment.

Political career

First stint (1870-1880) 
In 1869, Street was elected to represent Tishomingo County in the Mississippi House of Representatives. In 1870, he introduced a bill creating Prentiss County. Representing Prentiss County, he served two-year terms, ending in 1880 when he chose not to seek re-election in 1879. From 1873 to 1874 and from 1876 to 1878, Street was the Speaker of the Mississippi House.

Second and third stints (1890-1894, 1908-1912) 
In 1889, Street was elected to represent Lauderdale County in the Mississippi House of Representatives, and served a two-year term from 1890 to 1892. During that term, Street introduced the bill that created the Mississippi Constitutional Convention of 1890, on which he served himself. The convention created the 1890 Mississippi Constitution, which disenfranchised black voters. Street was re-elected in 1891 for a four-year term and was elected Speaker again, by a close 61–59 vote, in 1892. However, he resigned during the legislature's 1894 session. On November 5, 1907, Street was elected for another four-year House term from 1908 to 1912. On January 7, 1908 (also his 75th birthday), Street was also elected Speaker of the House for that term. In total, he served as the Speaker of the Mississippi House of Representatives in four different stints.

Later life 
Street died at his home in Meridian, Mississippi, on May 31, 1920.

Personal life 
Street married Charlotte Elizabeth Prindle on November 2, 1858. Street then married Charlotte Augusta Ryder on October 13, 1887. As of 1908, Street had five living children: Charles R., Albert J., Bessie Lee (Street) Coburn, Ethel, and Lottie Prentiss (Street) Champenois.

References 

1833 births
1920 deaths
Speakers of the Mississippi House of Representatives
Democratic Party members of the Mississippi House of Representatives
People from Prentiss County, Mississippi
People from Tishomingo County, Mississippi
American people of Scottish descent
People from Meridian, Mississippi